Haigh's Chocolates is an Australian family owned bean-to-bar chocolate making company based in Adelaide, South Australia. It was founded in 1915 by Alfred E. Haigh and now has retail outlets in Canberra, Melbourne and Sydney.

History
Alfred E. Haigh was born in 1877 in Adelaide, South Australia. His first shop opened on 1 May 1915 at 34 King William Street and moved a few doors along to Beehive Corner in 1922 on Rundle Mall and King William Street. The décor of the shop remains the same as when it first opened. John Haigh (Alfred's grandson) wanted to expand the chocolate making aspects of the business, and went to learn about chocolate manufacturing with Lindt & Sprüngli in Switzerland to bring new techniques back to Australia.

In the 1950s and 1960s, Haigh's chocolates were sold in cinemas by "Tray Girls" and "Tray Boys". When cinema attendance fell, Haigh ventured to Melbourne to expand his already popular business.

Corporate affairs

Chocolates stores 
Haigh's Chocolates have seven stores in South Australia, three are located in the Adelaide city centre, including the Beehive Corner store in Rundle Mall, and Adelaide Central Market. The Visitor Centre store also conducts viewing tours of the Parkside factory site that is located behind the store.

Melbourne has seven Haigh's stores, five in the CBD, including a flagship store in the Block Arcade, the newest store is on Elizabeth Street with suburban stores in Hawthorn and Toorak.

There are six Haigh's stores in Sydney in the Queen Victoria Building, The Strand Arcade, Chatswood Chase, Westfield Bondi Junction, Westfield Miranda and Castle Towers. There is also a store in the Canberra Centre. Since October 2014, Haigh's has also sold its chocolate range online.

Products 
Haigh's produces a variety of chocolate-based confectionary, including regular chocolate bars, blocks, loose chocolates and a variety of seasonal and gift products.

Awards and recognitions 
In 2022, the company received a consumer award at the South Australian Premier’s Food and Beverage Industry Awards.

Miscellaneous 
Haigh's supports Alternative Communities Trade in Vanuatu (ACTIV), local chocolate-making company Aelan and local cocoa bean farmers from the region. The company has produced a single-origin Vanuatu chocolate bar through the cooperation.

Rabbits in Australia, initially introduced to the continent by European settlers in the 1700s, have become an unwanted pest since the late 1800s, causing widespread environmental and economic damage, and expensive control measures like the rabbit-proof fence. In a clever piece of marketing, since Easter 1993, Haigh's has sold a chocolate Easter Bilby as an alternative to the Easter Bunny.

See also

South Australian food and drink

References

External links

Australian brands
Australian chocolate companies
Companies based in Adelaide
Retail companies established in 1915
Australian companies established in 1915
Food and drink companies established in 1915
Family-owned companies of Australia
Chocolateries